Mont Poupet is a mountain in the Jura Mountains, Bourgogne-Franche-Comté, eastern France. From up there you can look down over the whole valley of Salins-les-Bains.

The mountain is mostly composed of limestone.

Mountains of Bourgogne-Franche-Comté